Cocos Islands, also called Ile Aux Cocos, are a group of small islets in the Seychelles archipelago.
They can be found 7 km north of La Digue and lies in close proximity to La Digue's other neighbours, Félicité Island and the Sisters Islands. It has been a marine park since 1996 and is a spectacular spot for snorkeling and diving and a popular venue for day excursions from both Praslin and La Digue. No accommodation is offered on this island.

Gallery

References 

La Digue and Inner Islands
Archipelagoes of Seychelles